John McEvilly (1818–1902) was an Irish Roman Catholic Church clergyman who served as the Archbishop of Tuam from 1881 to 1902.

He was born on 15 April 1818 in Louisburgh, a small town near Westport, County Mayo, Ireland. He entered the Seminary of Tuam in January 1833, then was sent to Maynooth College in September 1833, where among his contemporaries was the future Archbishop of Armagh Joseph Dixon. In 1842, McEvilly was ordained a priest of the Archdiocese of Tuam.

On 9 January 1857, he was appointed the Bishop of Galway by the Holy See and was consecrated on 22 March 1857 by the Most Reverend John MacHale, Archbishop of Tuam. While as Bishop of Galway, McEvilly was appointed the Apostolic Administrator of Kilmacduagh and Kilfenora in September 1866 and appointed Coadjutor Archbishop of Tuam on 11 January 1878. On the death of Archbishop MacHale, he succeeded as the Metropolitan Archbishop of Tuam on 7 November 1881.

He was instrumental in setting up St Joseph's Industrial School, Letterfrack, and he produced a number of well respected Bible commentaries. 

Archbishop McEvilly died in office on 26 November 1902, aged 84.

References

Bibliography

 
 

1818 births
1902 deaths
19th-century Roman Catholic archbishops in Ireland
Religious leaders from County Mayo
People from County Galway
Roman Catholic bishops of Galway, Kilmacduagh and Kilfenora
Roman Catholic archbishops of Tuam
Alumni of St Patrick's College, Maynooth